The Cohutta Mountains is a mountain range in Georgia, U.S.

Cohutta is a name derived from the Cherokee language meaning "a shed roof supported on poles".

The range includes:
 Big Frog Mountain
 Fort Mountain (Murray County, Georgia)
Grassy Mountain (Georgia), in Murray County near Lake Conasauga

References

See also
 Cohutta Wilderness

Mountain ranges of Georgia (U.S. state)
Landforms of Murray County, Georgia